Starts Brocēni is a Latvian football club. Currently it plays in the 2nd Latvian league under the name Saldus FK/Brocēni. It was one of the leading Latvian clubs in the 1960s and 1970s.

History

CSK Brocēni
The club was founded in 1961 in the small Latvian town of Brocēni as CSK Brocēni. In its first year the club won the Latvian Cup and finished 4th in the league. The following years were less successful for the club. In 1965–1967 it got three tenth-place finishes in a row.

Starts Brocēni

In 1980 Starts finished last in the Latvian league and was relegated. In 1982, they were back but faced another relegation as they earned 11 points over 24 matches. The 1980s were a bad decade for the club from Brocēni which played in lower Latvian leagues. Only in 1991 Starts again played in the top Latvian league and after finishing 9th from 20 clubs it earned a place in the first season of the newly independent Virslīga.

The first Virslīga season was not a big success for Brocēni - only 11th place from 12th teams and relegation to 1. līga. In 1994 Starts finished second in the first league and together with Kvadrāts Rīga returned to Virslīga. The return proved quite successful as Starts finished in 4th place, in 1996 they were 6th (as FC Starts Brocēni) but the club couldn't fulfill the financial requirements for the 1997 Virslīga season, so it was relegated to 1. liga.

FK Saldus
In 1997 when Brocēni had lost its place in Virslīga it relocated to the nearby city of Saldus and changed the club name to FK Saldus. From 1997 to 2000 Saldus played in the first league but before the 2001 it withdrew from the league and moved to the 2nd league, where the club plays until now.

FK Saldus/Brocēni
In 2004, the club changed name again by adding Brocēni to its name, thus proving the connection with the formerly popular name of Starts Brocēni. In 2005, the club earned a promotion to 1. liga but refused because of its financial limitations.

Honours
Honours
 Latvian top league:
 Winners: 1 (1968)
 Runners-up: 1 (1973)
 Latvian Cup:
 Winners: 2 (1961, 1968)
 Runners-up: 1 (1973)

References

Saldus
Football clubs in Latvia
1961 establishments in Latvia